Ewha Womans University is a private women's university in Seoul founded in 1886 by Mary F. Scranton under Emperor Gojong. It was the first university founded in South Korea. Currently, Ewha is one of the world's largest female educational institutes and one of the most prestigious universities in South Korea. It is the only university in Korea that has an exchange program with Harvard University.

History

Ewha Womans University traces its roots back to Mary F. Scranton's Ewha Haktang mission school for girls, which opened with one student on May 31, 1886.  The name Ewha, which means “Pear Blossom,” was bestowed by the Emperor Gojong the following year. The image of the pear blossom is incorporated in the school's logo.

The school began providing college courses in 1910, and professional courses for women in 1925. The high school section, now known as Ewha Girls' High School (not to be confused with the coeducational Ewha Womans University High School, the university's demonstration school, founded in 1958), separated from the college section and is currently located in Jung-gu, Seoul. Both institutions share the same motto and the "pear blossoms" image in their logos.

Immediately following liberation of Korea on August 15, 1945, the college received government permission to become a university.  It was the first South Korean university to be officially organized.

Student population
According to figures provided by the university in April 2018, there are 21,596 enrolled students at the university.

While figures on the student body's gender breakdown are not available, Korea JoongAng Daily reported in 2003 there were 10 male students enrolled at the time. In 2009, Asian Correspondent reported that male students make up 30% of all foreign international students at the university.

Collaborations
The university collaborates with around 830 partners in 64 countries including Australian National University, Cornell University, Freie University of Berlin, Ghent University, Harvard University, Indiana University, King's College London, Mount Allison University, Nanyang Technological University, The Ohio State University, Peking University, University of Kuala Lumpur, University of California, Santa Cruz, University of British Columbia, University of Edinburgh, University of Hong Kong, University of South Carolina, Uppsala University, Waseda University, and a direct exchange program with Mills College in Oakland, California.

Name

The university now explains its peculiar name by saying that while the lack of an apostrophe in "Womans University" is unconventional, the use of "Woman" rather than "Women" was normal in the past.

It claims the use of "Womans" carries special meaning in that the early founders of the college thought that every woman is to be respected; to promote this idea, they chose the word "woman" to avoid lumping students together under the word "women". The claim has not been substantiated.

Museum 
Ewha Womans University Museum opened in April 1935. It has a wide range of artifacts, ranging from paintings, ceramics, crafts, doubles and folk items, and its main collection is the Korean National Treasure No. 107 white porcelain, iron and grape jars. The museum consists of a permanent exhibition hall, a planning exhibition hall, a donation exhibition hall and a Damin Goksik art museum.

Academics

Colleges 

College of Liberal Arts
Division of Liberal Arts
Korean Language & Literature
Chinese Language & Literature
English Language & Literature
French Language & Literature
German Language & Literature
History
Philosophy
Christian Studies
College of Social Sciences
Political Science & International Relations 
Public Administration
Economics
Consumer Studies
Library & Information Science
Sociology
Social Welfare
Psychology
Division of Communication & Media
Communication & Media
College of Natural Sciences
Division of Mathematical & Physical Sciences
Mathematics
Statistics
Physics
Division of Molecular Life & Chemical Sciences
Chemistry & Nano Science
Life Science
ELTEC College of Engineering
Division of Software Science & Engineering
Computer Science & Engineering
Cyber Security
Division of Advanced Technology
Electronic & Electrical Engineering
Food Science & Engineering
Chemical Engineering & Materials Science
Division of Sustainable Systems Engineering
Architecture
Architectural & Urban Systems Engineering
Environmental Science & Engineering
Climate & Energy Systems Engineering
Division of Mechanical & Biomedical Engineering
Mechanical Engineering Track
Biomedical Engineering Track
Biodata Engineering Track

College of Music
Keyboard Instruments
Orchestral Instruments
Voice
Composition
Korean Music
Dance
College of Art & Design
Division of Fine Arts
Korean Painting
Fine Arts
Sculpture
Ceramic Arts
Division of Design
Space Design
Visual Communication Design
Industrial Design
Media Interaction Design
Division of Fiber & Fashion
Fiber Arts
Fashion Design
College of Education
Education
Early Childhood Education
Elementary Education 
Educational Technology
Special Education
English Education
Social Studies Education
Korean Education
Science Education
Mathematics Education
College of Business Administration
Division of Business Administration
Business Administration
College of Science & Industry Convergence
Content Convergence
Fashion Industry
International Office Administration
Kinesiology & Sports Studies
Nutritional Science & Food Management
Health Convergence

College of Medicine
Division of Medicine
Pre-medicine
Medicine
College of Nursing
Division of Nursing
Nursing
Global Health & Nursing
College of Pharmacy
Pharmacy
College of Scranton
Scranton Honors Program
Division of Convergence & Interdisciplinary Studies
Brain & Cognitive Sciences
Division of International Studies
International Studies
Global Korean Studies

Graduate schools 

The Graduate School
Multicultural & Intercultural Studies
Korean Language & Literature
Chinese Language & Literature
English Language & Literature
French Language & Literature  
German Language & Literature
Christian Studies
Philosophy
History  
Art History
Political Science & International Relations
Public Administration
Economics  
Library & Information Science
Sociology
Social Welfare
Psychology  
Consumer Studies
Communication
Women's Studies
Child Development  
North Korean Studies 
Education
Early Childhood Education
Elementary Education  
Educational Technology
Special Education
English Education
Department of Social Studies Education
Korean Education
Communication Disorders
Law
Business Administration  
International Office Administration
Music Therapy
Mathematics
Statistics  
Physics
Chemistry & Nano Science
Life Sciences
Division of Life & Pharmaceutical Sciences
Pharmaceutical Sciences
Industrial Pharmaceutical Science

Science Education
Mathematics Education  
Health Education & Management
Nursing Science
Nutritional Science & Food Management
Division of Eco Science  
Medical Sciences
Bioinspired Science
Brain & Cognitive Sciences
Computer Science & Engineering  
Electronics Engineering
Architecture
Architecture Engineering
Environmental Science & Engineering  
Atmospheric Science & Engineering
Food Science & Technology
Digital Media
Music  
Fine Arts
Design
Clothing & Textiles
Dance  
Human Movement Studies
Medicine
Area Studies
Bioethics Policy Studies  
East Asians Studies
Gifted Education
Multicultural/Intercultural Studies
Bio-Information Science
Big Data Analytics
Interdisciplinary Program in Behavioral Socioeconomics
Interdisciplinary Program of Ecocreative
Interdisciplinary Program of Social Economy

Professional Graduate School
International Studies (GSIS)
Translation & Interpretation
Business (MBA)
Medicine
Law
Special Graduate School
Education
Design
Social Welfare
Theology
Policy Sciences
Performing Arts 
Clinical & Public Health Convergence
Clinical Dentistry
Teaching Foreign Languages

Rankings

Controversies and criticisms

Helen Kim 
Helen Kim, the seventh principal and first Korean principal of Ewha, is considered to be pro-Japanese. She is known to have encouraged young men to enlist in the Japanese army. The statue of Helen Kim and the building named after her on campus have both been criticized. Many protests were organized to take down the statue.

Women's rights movements 
While Ewha Womans University has been the center of women's rights movements, this feminist feature created controversies in Korea. One example of controversies was men's benefit from military service. Originally, getting extra points on employment and being paid for higher step in the salary class were available to males who had done their mandatory military service. In 1999, a couple of Ewha Womans University students and one male student, who was a disabled student at Yonsei University, claimed that this law was both sexist and discriminatory toward disabled people. This case eventually went to court, and the court ruled in the students' favor.

2016 South Korean political scandal 
Ewha Womans University became embroiled in the 2016 South Korean political scandal, because a former student, Chung Yoo-ra, was admitted under a special rule change by virtue of her mother's close connections to South Korean President Park Geun-hye despite not meeting requirements. Students had already been protesting against some of the university's unilateral changes to the degree system and departments before the political scandal blew up. As a result, the university's president, Choi Kyunghee, was ousted and convicted and Chung Yoo-ra's degree was rescinded.

Achievements
 Among the women lawmakers appointed to the 19th National Assembly (2012–2016), 27.6% are Ewha alumnae.
 The only Korean university participating as a partner in the Harvard College in Asia Program (HCAP) and Ewha-Harvard Summer School Program.
 Produced the sixth highest number of successful candidates in National Judicial Exam and the seventh highest number in Civil Service Exam in 2013 (ranked fifth in 2012).
 First among all private Korean universities in the number of citations per research paper in the 2012 Chosun-QS Evaluation of Asian Universities.

Awards
 321st in the 2013 Leiden Ranking, a qualitative assessment of faculty research in the world's top 500 universities.
 299th in the QS World University Rankings in 2018.
 Ninth among all Korean universities in the Chosun-QS Evaluation of Asian Universities in 2016.

Distinguished Honorary Ewha Fellows
Hillary Clinton — Former United States Secretary of State.
Drew Gilpin Faust — President of Harvard University.
Tarja Halonen — The 11th President of Finland.

Distinguished Honorary Ewha Doctorates 

 Ban Ki-moon — Former Secretary General of the United Nations.
Angela Merkel — Former Chancellor of Germany.  
Kersti Kaljulaid — President of Estonia. 
Michelle Bachelet — Former President of Chile.
Ertharin Cousin — Former Executive Director of the United Nations World Food Programme.

Distinguished Fellows of the Ewha Academy for Advanced Studies
Muhammad Yunus — President of Grameen Bank and the 2006 Nobel Peace Prize recipient.
George Smoot — Recipient of Nobel Prize in Physics in 2006.
Robert H. Grubbs — American chemist and a Nobel laureate.
Jane Goodall — British anthropologist.
Jocelyn Bell Burnell — Professor of Astrophysics at Oxford University.

Notable alumni

Politics and government
Choi Young-ae — current and first female chair of National Human Rights Commission of Korea.
Chun Hui-kyung — current member of the National Assembly.
Han Myeong-sook — former and first female Prime Minister of South Korea.
Jeon Yeo-ok — South Korean politician.
Kim Yoon-ok — former First Lady, the wife of South Korean President Lee Myung-bak.
Lee Mi-kyung (politician) — current and first female president of Korea International Cooperation Agency.
Lee Tai-Young — first Korean female lawyer and first female judge.
Son Myung-soon — former First Lady, the wife of South Korean President Kim Young-sam.
Yoo Eun-hae — current and first female Deputy Prime Minister of South Korea.

Business
Lee Yoon-hyung — Samsung Group chief Lee Kun-hee's daughter.

Science
Insoo Kim Berg — Korean-born American psychotherapist.
Esther Park — first Korean female doctor.
So-Jung Park — award-winning Korean professor of chemistry.
Yoo-Yeon Kim — tripleS member.

Sports
Hong Eun-ah — youngest Korean FIFA referee.
Kim Hae-jin – South Korean figure skater.
Kwak Min-jeong — South Korean figure skater.

Entertainment
Claudia Kim — actress
Goo Jae-yee – actress
Kim Hye-ja — actress
Kim Seo-yeon — Miss Korea 2014 
Kim Yeo-jin — actress
Kwak Hyun-hwa — actress
Lee Yu-bi — actress
Park Hae-mi — musical actress
Seo Min-jung — actress
Yang Jin-sung — actress
Lilka – YouTuber and live streamer
Roh Yoon-seo — actress and model

Others
Chung Hyun Kyung — theologian, professor at Union Theological Seminary of Columbia University
Sanghee Song — artist
Helen Kim — first female Korean Doctor of Philosophy, and also the first Korean female Bachelor of Arts.
JaHyun Kim Haboush – scholar of history, literature, gender studies, and King Sejong Professor of Korean Studies at Columbia University
Lee Ae-ran — first female North Korean defector to earn a doctorate, which she earned from Ewha Womans University in the subject of food and nutrition in 2009.

Affiliated facilities
Ewha Womans University Museum
Ewha Womans University Natural History Museum
Ewha Womans University Medical Center
Ewha Institute For Leadership Development
Ewha Advanced IT Education Center
Ewha School Of Continuing Education
Ewha Language Center
Ewha Archives
Ewha Elementary School
Ewha Kindergarten
Ewha Kumnan High School
Ewha Kumnan Middle School
Youngran Information Industry High School
Youngran Girl's Middle School

Public transportation
  Ewha Womans University Station
  Sinchon Station (Gyeongui Line)

See also
Education in South Korea
List of colleges and universities in South Korea
Ewha Womans University Station
Idae area
Center for Quantum Nanoscience

References

External links

EWHA by ArchiDiAP
Official website, in Korean and English
Official website for international programs, in Korean and English

 Ewha Womans University Museum at Google Cultural Institute

 
Educational institutions established in 1886
Universities and colleges in Seoul
Women's universities and colleges in South Korea
Seodaemun District
Merrell Hitotsuyanagi buildings
Association of Christian Universities and Colleges in Asia
1886 establishments in Korea
Institute for Basic Science
Private universities and colleges in South Korea